Ketzin (official name: Ketzin/Havel) is a town in the Havelland district, in Brandenburg, Germany. It is situated on the river Havel, 17 km northwest of Potsdam, and 40 km west of Berlin.

History

Demography

Geography
The town counts 6 Ortsteile (civil parishes): Etzin, Falkenrehde, Knoblauch, Paretz, Tremmen and Zachow.

Transport
The Ketzin Cable Ferry, a vehicular cable ferry, crosses the Havel between Ketzin and Schmergow.

References

External links

Localities in Havelland